Biraban ( – 14 April 1846) was a leader of the Awabakal people, an Aboriginal Australian people who lived in the area around what is today Lake Macquarie. His native name prior to Awabakal initiation was We-pohng; his naming as Biraban is reference to his totemic relationship with the eaglehawk.

Early life 
We-pohng was born at Bahtahbah (Belmont, New South Wales) c.1800. During his childhood We-pohng was abducted by the British and raised within the military barracks located in Sydney. Subsequently, We-pohng was assigned to Captain J.M. Gill, a member of the 46th Regiment. We-pohng remained with Captain Gill from February 1814 until Captain Gill departed Australia in December 1817. It was at this time We-pohng became fluent in English and was bestowed the name M'Gill (and its derivatives) by the captain as "a mark of his claim on the boy."

We-pohng commenced assisting Captain Allman in 1821 with the establishment of a penal colony, assuming the role of regional guide, interpreter and a special constable, with We-pohng utilising his tracking skills to apprehend convicts escaping from Port Macquarie.

Prior to his return to Newcastle in 1825 We-pohng married Ti-pah-mah-ah, with which he had one son, Ye-row-wa.

Return to Awabakal 
From 1825 Biraban served as an informant to the missionary Lancelot Edward Threlkeld teaching him the Awabakal language and cosmology.

In 1826 Biraban experienced his Awabakal clan initiation in which he was transposed from boyhood to manhood. Subsequently, Biraban acted as a spokesperson for the Awabakal clan, with part of his duties involving reporting 'assaults on Aboriginal people to Threlkeld who, in turn, reported them to the colonial authorities,' and acting as a distributor of British material goods to Aboriginal people.

Biraban assisted Threlkeld to establish a Mission of the London Missionary Society (LMS), and later the Colonial government Ebenezer (mission), on Awabakal land. In preparation for the LMS Mission Biraban worked alongside two other indigenous men to fell 'trees to make room for the erection of…[a mission] house and prepare for planting some Indian corn.'

Linguistic and translation work 
Speaking English fluently Biraban was frequently was called upon by the colonial government to act as an interpreter between Aboriginal clan members and settlers. A notable work in which Biraban was involved was the interpretation and transcription of Christian religious texts into the Awabakal language. Threlkeld recognised the value of Biraban as his local teacher, writing, '[i]t was very evident that M'Gill [Biraban] was accustomed to teach his native language, for when he was asked the name of anything, he pronounced the word very distinctly, syllable by syllable, so that it was impossible to mistake it.' It was later admitted by Threlkeld that Biraban was crucial to his translation work, with the Awabakal translation and publication of St. Luke's Gospel  being 'principally translated by Macgill himself.'

Whilst translating Christian texts Biraban also shared with Threlkeld knowledge of Awabakal cosmology, detailing stories of Koun, Tippakal, Por-rang, and his personal life. Biraban also incorporated Christian theology into the Awabakal cosmological order, offering a dreaming narrative, to Threlkeld, concerning Jehovah; Biraban conceptualised Jehovah as an indigenous being which appears to only men. Biraban's authority within the Aboriginal clans and his ability to disseminate Christian beliefs to Aboriginal people positioned Biraban to be considered by Threlkeld as a missionary teacher, yet this plan was abandoned as Threlkeld felt Biraban was unable to be baptised due to his preference for alcoholic beverages.

By 1830 the value Biraban's translation work was widely acknowledged. Governor Sir Ralph Darling gifted to Biraban a brass plate with the inscription: Baraban, or Macgil, Chief of the Tribe at Bartabah, on Lake Macquarie: a reward for his assistance in reducing his Native Tongue to a written language. At this time Biraban was also active in Supreme Court translations with Threlkeld. Yet, despite being fluent in English, Biraban's non-Christian status resulted with the Court dismissing Biraban as a competent witness.

Contemporary recognition 
Biraban is the inspiration for the poem The Eagle Chief.

The Biraban Public School in Toronto recognises Biraban's connection to the region and work as leader and linguist.

In the Canberra suburb of Aranda Biraban is remembered with a street named in his honour.

The University of Newcastle hosts the Birabahn Cultural Trail and Birabahn Building.

References

Bibliography

Further reading

External links
Australian Dictionary of Biography
Stories of Our Town Birabahn and Threlkeld: Finding the Third Space

1846 deaths
Year of birth unknown
Awabakal people